Brian Coles is a French rugby league footballer who represented France at the 1995 World Cup.

References

Living people
French rugby league players
France national rugby league team players
Rugby league wingers
Place of birth missing (living people)
Year of birth missing (living people)